Peter Richard Kenrick (August 17, 1806 – March 4, 1896) was Bishop of St. Louis, Missouri, and the first Catholic archbishop west of the Mississippi River.

Early life and ordination
Peter Richard Kenrick was born in Dublin on August 17, 1806. He was educated at Maynooth College, and ordained to the priesthood in 1832 by Archbishop Murray of Dublin. Prior to entering the seminary he worked with and befriended James Clarence Mangan the poet. The year following his ordination he travelled with his brother, Francis Kenrick, who eventually became the Bishop of Philadelphia and later the Archbishop of Baltimore.

In his early years as a priest in Philadelphia, Father Kenrick wrote several works relating to Catholic theology and church history.  One of his works, Validity of Anglican Ordinations examined, published in 1841, was not challenged for over a century.  He held a number of posts in the Philadelphia church, until he was appointed coadjutor bishop of St. Louis, Missouri in 1841.  At the time, the diocese included the entire area of the Louisiana Purchase, except for Iowa, Louisiana, and Minnesota.  In 1847, when the diocese became an archdiocese, he became the first archbishop of the newly created archdiocese.  The city itself would grow almost thirtyfold over the term of his residency.

Bishop
During his tenure in St. Louis, he visited many parts of the state of Missouri and actively encouraged the development of Catholicism and Catholic institutions in his diocese.  He started a Catholic journal, opened a seminary in the then-independent city of Carondelet, Missouri, and invited a number of Roman Catholic religious institutes to work in the diocese.

During the period of the American Civil War and its aftermath, Kenrick maintained a neutral position in a city and state whose residents were of widely divergent opinions on the matter.  After the war ended, he urged the priests in his diocese to refuse to take the ironclad oath which was intended to ensure that no person who had supported the Confederate position would ever achieve a position of influence, and supported those who did so.  One of these priests, the Reverend John A. Cummings, filed the case which the United States Supreme Court heard and prompted them to rule the ironclad oath unconstitutional.

He took part in the second Plenary Council of Baltimore, where he advocated that the affairs of the Catholic Church in the United States be handled locally wherever possible.  This position earned him a number of detractors and opponents.  During the First Vatican Council, he opposed the centralization of church authority in Rome and did not support the declaration of the dogma of Papal infallibility.  When it was defined dogmatically, he accepted the opinion of the majority.  His failure to support this issue increased the number and prominence of his detractors.

Later life
After harassment by his detractors and members of the curia made life difficult for him, he turned over the administration of the archdiocese to his coadjutor bishop, Patrick John Ryan, in 1871.  Upon Ryan being made the Archbishop of Philadelphia, the diocese which Kenrick's brother had previously headed, Kenrick took back active administration of his diocese.

During the period when the Knights of Labor, a strongly Roman Catholic labor union and the first national labor union, turned to violence, Kenrick vocally opposed them and condemned their actions.  However, the higher-ranking Cardinal James Gibbons, the Archbishop of Baltimore, overruled his objections.

In 1893, Kenrick's attempt to name his coadjutor bishop failed when his nominee did not win the support of his fellow bishops.  John Joseph Kain was appointed to fill the role instead.  His conflicts and failed communication with Kain lent a note of discord to his final years.

In 1896, he was canonically deposed by Pope Leo XIII because of physical incapacitation due to infirmity.

He died on March 4, 1896, and is buried in Calvary Cemetery in St. Louis, which is a cemetery Kenrick had himself established on a farm he bought. The seminary of the Archdiocese of St. Louis, Kenrick-Glennon Seminary, formerly known as Kenrick Theological Seminary, is named in his honor.

References

External links

Christensen, Lawrence O., et al., Dictionary of Missouri Biography.  Columbia, MO and London:University of Missouri Press, 1999.  

1806 births
1896 deaths
19th-century Roman Catholic archbishops in the United States
American Roman Catholic clergy of Irish descent
Roman Catholic archbishops of St. Louis
Irish emigrants to the United States (before 1923)
Alumni of St Patrick's College, Maynooth
Christian clergy from Dublin (city)
Clergy from Philadelphia
Clergy from St. Louis
Irish Roman Catholic missionaries
19th-century American Roman Catholic theologians
Burials at Calvary Cemetery (St. Louis)
Roman Catholic missionaries in the United States